Sabzevar County is in Razavi Khorasan province, Iran. The capital of the county is the city of Sabzevar. At the 2006 census, the county's population was 429,187, in 116,891 households. The following census in 2011 counted 319,893 people in 98,581 households, by which time Joghatai, Joveyn, and Khoshab Districts had been separated from the county to form three counties of the same names. At the 2016 census, Sabzevar County's population was 306,310 in 95,553 households, by which time Davarzan District had been separated from the county to form Davarzan County. After the census, Sheshtamad District was separated from the county to become Sheshtamad County.

Administrative divisions

The population history and structural changes of Sabzevar County's administrative divisions over three consecutive censuses are shown in the following table. The latest census shows three districts, 11 rural districts, and three cities.

Notable people
Ali Shariati, thinker

References

 

Counties of Razavi Khorasan Province